Euseius quetzali is a species of mite in the family Phytoseiidae.

References

quetzali
Articles created by Qbugbot
Animals described in 1985